Senator Downing may refer to:

Benjamin Downing (born 1981), Massachusetts State Senate
Bernard Downing (1869–1931), New York State Senate
Coe S. Downing (1791–1847), New York State Senate
Henry H. Downing (1853–1919), Virginia State Senate
Michael Downing (born 1954), New Hampshire State Senate
Philip Downing (1871–1961), Wisconsin State Senate